Blair James Barnes (September 21, 1960 – June 29, 2010) was a Canadian professional ice hockey right winger who played in one National Hockey League game for the Los Angeles Kings during the 1982–83 season. The rest of his career, which lasted from 1980 to 1984, was spent in the minor leagues.

Playing career and death
Barnes played three seasons with the Windsor Spitfires from 1977-1980 scoring 127 goals and 169 assists for 296 points in 198 games. He was selected by the Edmonton Oilers in the sixth round of the 1979 NHL Entry Draft and then played two seasons (1980–1982) with the Wichita Wind of the Central Hockey League before being traded to the Los Angeles Kings in 1982. Barnes played one season with the Kings AHL affiliate team, the New Haven Nighthawks and he scored 29 goals while recording 34 assists for 63 points in 72 games during the 1982-1983 season before being called up by the Kings, where he played his only National Hockey League game. He finished his hockey career with the AHL's Nova Scotia Voyageurs scoring 31 goals and adding 32 assists for 63 points in 80 games played. On June 29, 2010, he died from a heart attack.

Career statistics

Regular season and playoffs

See also
 List of players who played only one game in the NHL

References

External links
 

1960 births
2010 deaths
Canadian ice hockey right wingers
Edmonton Oilers draft picks
Ice hockey people from Ontario
Los Angeles Kings players
New Haven Nighthawks players
Nova Scotia Voyageurs players
Sportspeople from Windsor, Ontario
Wichita Wind players
Windsor Spitfires players